Columbine High School (CHS) is a public high school in Columbine, Colorado, United States, in the Denver metropolitan area. It is part of the Jefferson County Public Schools district.

In 1999, it became the scene of an infamous mass shooting, where 12 students and one teacher were murdered by senior students Eric Harris and Dylan Klebold before the pair committed suicide.

History 
Columbine High School opened in 1973 with a capacity for 1,652 students. It was named after the surrounding community of Columbine, which in turn was named after the state flower of Colorado: the columbine. The school's first principal was Gerald Difford. There was no senior class during the school's first year; its first graduating class was in 1975. The school colors were selected through a vote by students at Ken Caryl Junior High School and Bear Creek High School, who were the first to attend Columbine High School when it opened in 1973.

The school has undergone significant renovations since it first opened: in 1995, with the addition of a new cafeteria and library; in 1999–2000 (after the massacre), with interior renovations to the corridors, cafeteria, and former library; and in the early 2000s, with the addition of the new HOPE Columbine Memorial Library and a memorial on the site.

Massacre 

Columbine High School was the site of one of the deadliest mass shootings in modern United States history. The shootings occurred on April 20, 1999, when senior students Eric Harris and Dylan Klebold killed twelve students and a teacher, and wounded 24 others, before they both committed suicide. The massacre made headlines both nationally and internationally, making Columbine a household name, and causing a moral panic in U.S. high schools. It was the deadliest high school shooting in U.S. history until February 14, 2018, when 17 people were killed in the Stoneman Douglas High School shooting.

After the shooting, classes at Columbine were held at nearby Chatfield Senior High for the remaining three weeks of that school year.

The school went through a major renovation in 1995, just four years before the massacre, adding a new library and cafeteria. After the shootings, Columbine completely demolished its library, located above the cafeteria, since it was the site where the majority of the deaths occurred. The site was then turned into a memorial ceiling and atrium; a new, larger library was built on the hill where the shooting began and dedicated to the memory of the victims.

By 2019, the school remained a "macabre tourist attraction" for those fascinated by the massacre, with hundreds stopped annually caught trespassing on the grounds or trying to enter the buildings. In June 2019, the superintendent of Jefferson County Public Schools proposed tearing down the school and rebuilding it more securely to lessen its "morbid fascination".

Attendance zone 
Its attendance zone includes the Columbine CDP.

Notable students 

 Darrel Akerfelds – Major League Baseball pitcher playing with the Oakland Athletics, Cleveland Indians, Texas Rangers and Philadelphia Phillies from 1986 through 1991
 Cassie Bernall – one of the 13 victims of the Columbine High School massacre
 Sera Cahoone – singer-songwriter
 Austin Eubanks – motivational speaker on drug addiction and recovery, and injured survivor of the Columbine High School massacre
 Skip Ewing – country songwriter and artist
 Eric Harris – one of the perpetrators of the Columbine High School massacre
 Wes Hart – MLS player who last played for the San Jose Earthquakes in 2005
 Allan Kayser – actor who played "Bubba" in the sitcom Mama's Family
 Dylan Klebold – one of the perpetrators of the Columbine High School massacre
 Sue Manteris – newscaster on Las Vegas TV media and channel 3; played CNN reporter Sue Tripathi in Miss Congeniality 2: Armed and Fabulous
 Todd Park Mohr – guitarist and vocalist of Big Head Todd and the Monsters
 Patrick Neville – politician
 Jeanie Schroder – member of DeVotchKa
 Rachel Scott – the first of the 13 victims of the Columbine High School massacre; the youth program Rachel's Challenge was created in her memory
 Longmont Potion Castle – comedian and musician known for albums of recorded absurdist prank calls
Woody Kincaid – American long-distance runner for Bowerman Track Club

See also 

 Columbine (book)

References

External links 

 

 
Columbine High School massacre
Public high schools in Colorado
Jefferson County Public Schools (Colorado)
Educational institutions established in 1973
1973 establishments in Colorado